Georgina (Canada 2016 Census population 45,418) is a town in south-central Ontario, and the northernmost municipality in the Regional Municipality of York. The town is bounded to the north by Lake Simcoe. Although incorporated as a town, it operates as a township in which dispersed communities share a common administrative council. The largest communities are Keswick, Sutton and Jackson's Point. Smaller communities include Pefferlaw, Port Bolster, Roches Point, Udora and Willow Beach. The town was formed by the merger of the Village of Sutton, the Township of Georgina and the Township of North Gwillimbury in 1971 and incorporated in 1986. North Gwillimbury had previously been part of Georgina but became its own township in 1826. It took its name from the family of Elizabeth Simcoe, née Gwillim.

Municipal composition
The main centres in Georgina are the communities of Keswick, Belhaven, Sutton West, Jackson's Point, Baldwin, Virginia, Pefferlaw, Port Bolster, Udora and Willow Beach. Other settlements include Jersey, Cedarbrae, Brown Hill, Island Grove, Maple Hill, Elm Grove, Roches Point (named for the family of Author Mazo de la Roche, who is buried in the cemetery, at St. George's Anglican Church, Sibbald Point), Sibbald Point, Virginia/Virginia Beach (originally called Frenchtown), McRae Beach, Duclos Point, Balfour Beach, Varney, Brighton Beach and a variety of other beach communities.

Demographics

Racial profile As per the 2011 Canadian Census
96.1% White
1.6% Aboriginal
0.5% Black
0.3% Chinese

Religions
45.7% Protestant
22.4% Roman Catholic
3.3% other Christian
0.3% Jewish
28.3% non-religious

Mother Tongue
 90.3% English
 1.2% French
 1.0% German
 1.0% Italian

Government

The Town of Georgina operates under a ward system, and its municipal council consists of the mayor, regional councillor (known procedurally as deputy mayor) and a councillor for each of the five wards. The current council consists of:
 Mayor: Margaret Quirk
 Deputy Mayor/Regional Councillor: Naomi Davison
 Councillor Ward 1: Charlene Biggerstaff
 Councillor Ward 2: Dan Fellini
 Councillor Ward 3: Dave Neeson
 Councillor Ward 4: Dale Kerr Genge
 Councillor Ward 5: Lee Dale

The mayor and deputy mayor represent Georgina at meetings of York Regional Council.

Georgina is part of the Federal riding of York—Simcoe, represented by Scot Davidson of the Conservative Party of Canada, who was elected in a by-election on February 25, 2019.

Provincially, it was part of the riding of York North until 2007 and is now part of the provincial riding of York—Simcoe, represented by Caroline Mulroney of the Progressive Conservative Party of Ontario.

Attractions

 Captain William Johnson's Old Mill
 St. George's Anglican Church, built in 1877 by the pioneering Sibbald family and burial place of Stephen Leacock and Mazo de la Roche
 Roche's Point Anglican Church, built in 1862
 The ROC (Recreational Outdoor Campus), including the Georgina Pioneer Village Museum and Archives
 The Red Barn Theatre, Canada's oldest summer stock theatre. [Currently not operating due to a fire in 2010.]
 Stephen Leacock Theatre
 Georgina Chamber of Commerce and Tourism Information Centre
 Duclos Point Nature Reserve
 Georgina Arts Centre and Gallery
 The Peter Gzowski Festival of Stories
 Georgina Public Libraries
 York Regional Forests
 Sibbald Point Provincial Park
 Sutton Fair and Horse Show
 Ramada Jacksons Point Resort and Spa
 Willow Beach Conservation Area
 Georgina Military Museum
 The Briars (Georgina)

Climate

Notable residents
Canadian Wrestling Hall of Fame member Whipper Billy Watson was a lifelong resident, and he spearheaded the campaign to build the Georgina Cultural Centre in the 1980s, which also houses the Stephen Leacock Theatre.
Keswick is the birthplace and childhood home of former NHL goaltender Curtis Joseph.
Captain William Johnson, former Royal Navy officer and founder of Pefferlaw, Ontario.
 Noted writer Stephen Leacock settled on a farm near Egypt, a hamlet within Georgina.
Jim Carrey, a Canadian actor, comedian, impressionist, screenwriter, and producer. He was born in nearby Newmarket. His family settled in Jackson's Point in his late teens.
Caroline Mulroney and her husband own land in Jackson's Point.

Local media
 Georgina Advocate  (Metroland Media Group)

See also

List of townships in Ontario

Notes

References

External links

 
Lower-tier municipalities in Ontario
Towns in Ontario
1971 establishments in Ontario